Tiberiu-Marian Georgescu (born 8 February 1991) is an chess grandmaster.  Tiberiu is playing for Vados Arad Chess Club and he is a member of Romanian National Team. Besides chess, Tiberiu is active in IT field. He has a PhD in Economic Informatics and is one of the founders of Chess Coders company.    

Tiberiu Georgescu has won numerous national and international tournaments. His most important achievements are: 

 Silver medal at the 2019 Romanian National Championships 
 Romanian National Chess Champion in 2018 
 Bronze Medal at the 2016 Romanian National Championship

References 

1991 births
Living people
Chess grandmasters
Romanian chess players